"Day by Day" (데이 바이 데이) is a song by South Korean girl group T-ara from the EP of the same name, released in 2012 as it lead single. It was composed by Kim Tae-hyun and produced by Cho Young Soo and Ahn Young-min.

This was T-ara's first song featuring new member Areum and the last with Ryu Hwa-Young.

Background and release 
"Day by Day" was the product of Kim Tae-Hyun, by Cho Young-soo and Ahn Young-min, who have all previously worked with T-ara on songs such as "Cry Cry" and "You Drive Me Crazy". Before its official release, a choreography video in which "Day by Day" can be heard was leaked to YouTube in late May 2012. The song is a ballad with a flute beat, with lyrics about a girl pleadingly begging a boy to take her with him. The choreography was made by John Temorning who choreographed Beyoncé's "Single Lady".

On July 30, 2012, Kim Kwang-Soo, Core Contents Media's representative, issued a statement that Ryu Hwa-young would unconditionally terminate her contract and quit T-ara. This incident and the previous rumors of incompatibility between the group's members caused pressure from the public and led to ending the promotion schedule of "Day by Day" early, and therefore the Inkigayo performance (aired on July 29) marked the end of the promotion period. Hwa-Young didn't perform on stage for that performance due to an alleged foot injury. Since Hwa-Young's withdrawal was sudden, members Hyo-Min and Eun-Jung who coverf her rap parts, had to read lyrics from staff's sign on stage.

Japanese version 
"Day by Day" received a Japanese version and was released as a b-side track on T-ara's 10th Japanese single "Sexy Love" along with an instrumental version on November 26, 2012. It also had another music video released only on Japanese streaming platforms which consists of different shots from the original Korean music videos.

It was also released as a stand-alone single in Japan along with "Sexy Love" (Japanese Ver.) with a different cover but it is only available digitally.

Music videos 
The song's music video was officially released on July 3. It was directed by Cha Eun-taek in Seoul, South Korea. It was announced on June 12, 2012, as a 20-minute music video drama starring the group themselves in a science-fiction setting, reminiscent of the movie Mad Max. A large amount of work was needed to complete the computer graphics featured in the video, which caused its release to be delayed by 13 hours. The second part of the music video was released in August, 2012. The video featured T-ara members with the participation of Dani, who was preparing for her debut with the group at the time, "Day By Day" was supposed to be her pre-debut. However, plans fell through and she never officially debuted with the group. Dani portrayed "the blind girl with superpowers" in the music video, she was then replaced by Eun-Jung in the second part of the drama version (Sexy Love).

The music video was included in the "Top 5 Videos of the Week" list by Stereogum.

Track listing

Commercial performance 
"Day by Day" was an immediate commercial success topping all Korean real-time charts within an hour of release achieving their sixth chart "All-Kill". The music video also topped GOMTV's chart in its first 30 minutes.

It reached number two on the Gaon Weekly Digital Singles Chart and the Billboard Korea K-Pop Hot 100. The song ranked among the best selling singles of the year with nearly 2,150,000 copies sold in South Korea alone by the end of 2012.

The Japanese version of "Day by Day" peaked at number 16 on the Billboard Japan Hot 100 singles chart and reached number 3 on the USEN Weekly singles chart.

Charts

Sales

Release history

References

External links 
 Sexy Love (Japanese Ver.). Oricon

T-ara songs
2012 songs